Niklas Fernando Nygård Castro (born 8 January 1996) is a football forward who currently plays for Brann. Born in Norway, Castro represents the Chile national team.

Club career
He played youth football for Manglerud Star. Ahead of the 2016 he was drafted into the senior team of first-tier club Vålerenga. He made his Norwegian top division debut in April 2016 against Stabæk.

Already on 15 June 2018, Castro signed with Aalesund for the 2019 season. The contract was until 2021.

International career
Due to his Chilean heritage, on 3 October 2019, Castro was officially called up to the Chile national team for the friendly matches against Colombia and Guinea. Since he did not have Chilean nationality at the time, he was included in the squad as a "special guest" according to manager Reinaldo Rueda.

On 27 February 2020, it was confirmed Castro officially acquired the Chilean nationality and may be called up to the national team according to Ambassador of Chile to Norway, Waldemar Coutts. So, in November 2020, he received his first official call up to the Chile senior team for the 2022 World Cup qualifiers against Peru and Venezuela, making his international debut in the first match at the minute 83 by replacing Mauricio Isla.

Personal life
His father, Miguel, is a Chilean who came to Norway in 1994 and his mother, Anne, is Norwegian. He has a sister, Lene, and a brother, Fabian. His paternal grandfather, Óscar Castro, was a football referee who involved Niklas' uncles in football and then Niklas.

Career statistics

Club

References

External links
 
 Aalesunds FK profile
 

1996 births
Living people
Footballers from Oslo
Chilean footballers
Chile international footballers
Norwegian footballers
Sportspeople of Chilean descent
Naturalized citizens of Chile
Chilean people of Norwegian descent
Norwegian people of Chilean descent
Association football forwards
Vålerenga Fotball players
Eliteserien players
Kongsvinger IL Toppfotball players
Aalesunds FK players
Norwegian First Division players
Citizens of Chile through descent